Maigret and the Spinster  (other English-language title is Cécile is Dead) is a detective novel by Belgian writer Georges Simenon, featuring his character inspector Jules Maigret.

Other titles
The book has been translated two times into English: in 1977 as Maigret and the Spinster translated by Eileen Ellenbogen and in 2015 as Cécile is Dead translated by Anthea Bell.

Adaptations
The novel has been adapted seven times for cinema and television:

In French
1944: as Cécile est morte, with Albert Prejean in the main role;
1955: as Maigret dirige l'enquête, with Maurice Manson;
1967: as Cécile est morte, with Jean Richard in the lead role;
1994: as Cécile est morte, with Bruno Cremer;

In Italian
1964: as Un'ombra su Maigret, with Gino Cervi in the main role;

In English
1963: as Poor Cecile!, with Rupert Davies;

In Russian
1969: as Смерть Сесили, with Boris Tenin in the lead role.

Literature
Maurice Piron, Michel Lemoine, L'Univers de Simenon, guide des romans et nouvelles (1931-1972) de Georges Simenon, Presses de la Cité, 1983, p. 292-293

External links

Maigret at trussel.com

References

1942 Belgian novels
Maigret novels
Novels set in France
Novels set in the 20th century
Belgian novels adapted into films